Ganvesh is an Indian Marathi language film directed by Atul Jagdale. The film stars Kishor Kadam, Mukta Barve, Dilip Prabhavalkar and Smita Tambe. Music by Nihar Shembekar. The film was released on 24 June 2016.

Synopsis 
A poor couple who work in a brick manufacturing company struggles to provide their child with a new uniform as it becomes necessary before he gives a speech in front of a minister.

Cast 
 Kishor Kadam as Madhu's father
 Mukta Barve as Meera Patil 
 Dilip Prabhavalkar as education minister 
 Smita Tambe
 Guru Thakur
 Nagesh Bhosale
 Suhas Palshikar
 Ganesh Yadav
 Sharad Ponkshe
 Tanmay Mande as Madhu

Soundtrack

Critical response 
Ganvesh film received positive reviews from critics. Mihir Bhanage of The Times of India gave the film 3.5 stars out of 5 and wrote "Ganvesh is a heart-warming film that strikes the right chords. It teaches you a few life lessons and is definitely worth a watch". Ganesh Matkari of Pune Mirror wrote "Realist films exploring the social situation have a tendency to end on a negative note underlining the futility of the situation. Ganvesh ends on a marginally positive note but doesn’t feel like a compromise". A Reviewer of The Hollywood Reporter Wrote "The real hero of the tale emerges only gradually and it is Suryesh, the poor but proud father who searches high and low for the small amount needed to buy his beloved son a school uniform". Jaydeep Pathak of Maharashtra Times gave the film 3.5 stars out of 5 and wrote "This is the story of many uniforms created by the system. An attempt is made here to impress upon the audience the content of the fight given in their own way against the system. However, there are some 'threads' of this uniform too. This 'uniform' should be seen as a positive effort". A Reviewer of Loksatta wrote "In terms of acting, this movie is right. Some of the scenes in the film are very well put together. The comparison of Madhu's Independence Day speech between the Patri government's fight to oust the British and his father's struggle for uniform is truly heart-wrenching".

References

External links
 

2016 films
2010s Marathi-language films
Indian drama films